Andrew or Andy Robinson may refer to:

Entertainment
 Andrew Robinson (actor) (born 1942), American actor
 Andrew Cornell Robinson (born 1968), American artist
 Andrew R. Robinson, writer of Kaijudo and other television shows
 Andrew Robinson, comic book artist on Superman/Batman
 Andrew Robinson (Neighbours), a fictional Australian soap opera character

Sports
 Andrew Robinson (cricketer) (born 1981), Australian cricketer
 Andrew Robinson (water polo) (born 1988), Canadian water polo player
 Andy Robinson (footballer, born 1966), English former footballer
 Andy Robinson (footballer, born 1979), British football player
 Andy Robinson (footballer, born 1992), English footballer with Southampton F.C.
 Andy Robinson (born 1964), rugby union coach
 Andrew Robinson (canoeist), New Zealand slalom canoeist in 2006 Canoe Slalom World Cup

Other
 Andrew Robinson Stoney (1747–1810), Anglo-Irish adventurer
 Andrew Ernest Robinson (1893–1964), Canadian Member of Parliament
 Andrew J. Robinson (builder) (died 1922), builder in New York City
 W. Andrew Robinson (born 1957), British non-fiction author
 Andy Robinson (design manager), curator and art manager
 Andy Robinson (loyalist), Northern Ireland paramilitary leader
 Andrew Robinson (UK politician), founder of the Pirate Party UK
 Andrew Robinson, statistician and director of Centre of Excellence for Biosecurity Risk Analysis (CEBRA) in Melbourne